The Four Quartets Prize is an award of the Poetry Society of America, presented annually since 2018 in partnership with the T.S. Eliot Foundation. It is "first and foremost a celebration of the multi-part poem, which includes entire volumes composed of a unified sequence as well as novels in verse and book-length verse narratives."

Background 
The awards are named for T.S. Eliot's Four Quartets, written over a four-year period. The award recognizes the 75th anniversary of Eliot's New York publisher first collecting them in a single volume in 1943.

Eligibility 
The prize is awarded for a unified and complete sequence of poems. Examples of existing sequences that would fit the category:

 Gwendolyn Brooks, A Street in Bronzeville (1945) or The Anniad (1950)  

 John Berryman, 77 Dream Poems (1964) or His Toy, His Dream, His Rest (1968)

Winners receive a prize of $20,000; three finalists (including the eventual winner) receive $1,000 apiece. The prize does not require that nominees have an existing body of work or reach a certain age.

The Four Quartets Prize was first presented in 2018 to Danez Smith for their sonnet "summer, somewhere."

Four Quartets winners and finalists 

Winners are listed first, highlighted and with a double dagger.

References

External links 

 The Four Quartets Prize at the Poetry Society of America official website

American poetry awards
Awards established in 2018
2018 establishments in the United States